Saboot is a 1980 Indian Hindi-language horror/thriller film directed by Shyam Ramsay and Tulsi Ramsay. It stars Navin Nischol, Kajal Kiran, Vidya Sinha, Vinod Mehra, Trilok Kapoor, Om Shivpuri and Prem Chopra.

Plot
Seth Dharamdas (Trilok Kapoor) has two daughters: the older one is Asha (Vidya Sinha) and the younger one is Kajal (Kajal Kiran). Dharamdas had struck a business deal with Dhanraj. Here, Asha marries her love interest Vikas (Vinod Mehra), but he dies in an air crash. Asha grieves his loss, following which, Dharamdas cancels his plan to sell the factory and decides to dedicate the factory as a souvenir to Vikas.

Dhanraj (Prem Chopra) doesn't want this deal be cancelled and hence bribes Dharamdas's trusted employees Manmohan Saxena (Roopesh Kumar), Ashok Gupta (Narendranath) and Rita (Padma Khanna) into helping him to kill Dharamdas. Dharamdas has to go to Nainital for a business trip. However, he is approached by Dhanraj, Ashok and Manmohan in the train itself and is forced to sign an agreement that would entitle Dhanraj to be the sole owner of all his riches.

Dharamdas does as told, however the crooks kill him and bury him nearby. During the fracas, Ashok's knife falls down into the grave, but he is in a hurry and doesn't have time to take it out. In the meantime, Asha and Kajal are being looked after by Ajit Roy (Om Shivpuri), who used to hold a responsible post in the factory during Dharamdas's ownership. Ajit Roy strikes up another deal with Dhanraj.

Suddenly, the "ghost" of Dharamdas starts confronting his killers. The villains die due to the shock of seeing him. A wave of panic runs among the killers. Dharamdas's daughters are unaware of the truth, as they believe that their father has gone missing. Dharamdas's case is given to Inspector Anand (Navin Nischol), an old friend of Vikas. When the villains start dying mysteriously, Anand becomes confident that there is some connection between the deaths and the disappearance of Dharamdas.

Anand sets up traps, confident that Dharamdas is still alive and killing his associates for some still unknown reason. He has no luck until Dhanraj is killed. Anand sees Dharamdas and shoots him. The rest needs to be seen.

Cast
Navin Nischol as CBI Inspector Anand
Kajal Kiran as Kajal
Vidya Sinha as Asha
Vinod Mehra as Vikas
Prem Chopra as Dhanraj
Trilok Kapoor as Seth Dharamdas
Roopesh Kumar as Manmohan Saxena
Narendranath as Ashok Gupta
Padma Khanna as Rita
Om Shivpuri as Ajit Roy

Soundtrack
Lyrics: Amit Khanna

Legacy 
Saboot is considered as Ramsay Brothers most unique horror film out of the bunch of other typical horror films they made which were mostly about bhoot pret, cults, shaitan and chudail. Because unlike their other films this didn't exactly had any real ghost or supernatural incidents but something more unique which needs to be seen by the viewers themselves. The film is available on Amazon Prime Video and YouTube.

External links

References

1980 films
Indian horror films
1980s Hindi-language films
1980 horror films
Films scored by Bappi Lahiri
Indian slasher films
1980s slasher films
Hindi-language horror films
Films directed by Shyam Ramsay
Films directed by Tulsi Ramsay